Vagli Sotto is a comune (municipality) in the Province of Lucca in the Italian region of Tuscany, located about  northwest of Florence and about  northwest of Lucca.

Sotto borders the following municipalities: Camporgiano, Careggine, Massa, Minucciano, Stazzema.  The Lake of Vagli, created by a dam in 1947,  and the abandoned village of Fabbriche di Careggina, are  located nearby.

The town contains the Romanesque church of San Regolo.

References

External links
 Vagli Sotto
 Vagli Sotto

Cities and towns in Tuscany